Gabriela Dabrowski and Giuliana Olmos defeated Desirae Krawczyk and Demi Schuurs in the final, 7–6(7–1), 5–7, [10–7] to win the women's doubles tennis title at the 2022 Madrid Open. This was Dabrowski's third consecutive final at the tournament, having lost the previous two editions in 2021 and 2019.

Barbora Krejčíková and Kateřina Siniaková were the defending champions, but Krejčíková could not defend her title due to injury. Siniaková played alongside Leylah Fernandez, but lost in the second round to Ulrikke Eikeri and Tereza Mihalíková.

Seeds
The two top seeds received a bye into the second round.

Draw

Finals

Top half

Bottom half

Seeded teams 
The following are the seeded teams, based on WTA rankings as of April 25, 2022.

Other entry information

Wildcards
  Cristina Bucșa /  Nuria Párrizas Díaz

Protected ranking

Withdrawals 
Before the tournament
  Ulrikke Eikeri /  Catherine Harrison → replaced by  Ulrikke Eikeri /  Tereza Mihalíková
  Lucie Hradecká /  Sania Mirza → replaced by  Kaitlyn Christian /  Oksana Kalashnikova
  Nadiia Kichenok /  Raluca Olaru → replaced by  Nadiia Kichenok /  Ekaterine Gorgodze
  Veronika Kudermetova /  Elise Mertens → replaced by  Elena Rybakina /  Liudmila Samsonova
  Tereza Martincová /  Markéta Vondroušová → replaced by  Julia Lohoff /  Renata Voráčová
  Alexandra Panova /  Monica Niculescu → replaced by  Alexandra Panova /  Han Xinyun

References

External links
Main draw

2022 WTA Tour
Doubles women